Rupkothar Golpo: A Fairy Tale is a 2006 Bangladeshi film directed by Tauquir Ahmed. Impress Telefilm Limited produced and distributed the film.

Story
Rupkathar Golpo, is not a fairy tale as the title suggests, but is rather a story of the human condition in current times. The film centres on a desperate mother (Taskin Sumi) whose child is lost.
In the film a young man (Chanchal Chowdhury), fired on his first day at work, encounters a streetwalker with a child. To be able to buy some food for her baby, the girl decides to go with a truck driver (Tauquir Ahmed) leaving her child in the young man's care. The police however suspect the young man to be an abductor, seeing him with a baby that is apparently not his and he is taken to the police station.

After returning the girl cannot find her child and combs the city with the truck driver looking for the baby. The young man, incapable of articulating his pain, is an honest soul and being torn by responsibility and moral consequence cannot leave the child. He tries his best to save the baby. The truck driver starts gambling, loses everything and decides to bet the girl. His partners in the gamble rape her while he is left senseless under the influence of alcohol.

Within this unremarkable premise lies the profoundly moving story of Rupkothar Golpo. Filmed in the ravages of contemporary life, the movie is a sharp portrayal of despair and hope, desperation and survival, loss and redemption, poignantly told in subtle actions and spare words. The film narrates a story of humanity, in all its imperfections and cruelty.

Cast
 Chanchal Chowdhury
 Tauquir Ahmed
 Abul Hayat
 Humayun Faridi
 Dr. Enamul Haque
 Rahmat Ali
 Shabnam Parvin
 Ejajul Islam
 Hosne Ara Putul
 Taskin Sumi
 Mamunur Rashid
 Mosharraf Karim
 Tushar Khan
 Jhuna Chowdhury
 Saleh Ahmed

Soundtrack
The music of the film was directed by Bari Siddiqui. lyrics were penned by  Rabindranath Tagore, Nidhu Babu, Shahidullah Forayezi and Bari Siddiqui.

"Kachher Manush Amay Phele" (part 1) - Bari Siddiqui
"Kachher Manush Amay Phele" (part 2) - Bari Siddiqui 
"Hoilona Hoilona Amar Prem Sadhon" - Bari Siddiqui 
"Premer Ghuri Bin Batashe Ore" - Bari Siddiqui
"Shoto Noto Shyamo Rai" - Bari Siddiqui 
"Mono Jaago Mongolo Loke" - Bipasha Hayat
"Kar Tore Nishi Jaago" - Runa Laila

Awards
This film won several awards including

Dhaka International Film Festival
 Audience Choice Award: Film

Meril Prothom Alo Awards
 Critics Choice Best Director - Tauquir Ahmed
 Critics Choice Best Actor - Chanchal Chowdhury

See also
 Joyjatra
 Daruchini Dip

References

External links
 Rupkothar Golpo on BMDb

Bengali-language Bangladeshi films
2006 films
2000s Bengali-language films
Films directed by Tauquir Ahmed
Films scored by Bari Siddiqui
Impress Telefilm films